Parotis is a genus of moths of the family Crambidae.

Species
Parotis amboinalis (Swinhoe, 1906)
Parotis angustalis (Snellen, 1895)
Parotis ankaratralis Marion, 1954
Parotis arachnealis (Walker, 1859)
Parotis athysanota (Hampson, 1912)
Parotis atlitalis (Walker, 1859)
Parotis baldersalis (Walker, 1859)
Parotis bracata (E. Hering, 1901)
Parotis brunneomarginalis (Kenrick, 1907)
Parotis chlorochroalis (Hampson, 1912)
Parotis confinis (Hampson, 1899)
Parotis costulalis (Strand, 1912)
Parotis egaealis (Walker, 1859)
Parotis fallacialis (Snellen, 1890)
Parotis fasciculata (Aurivillius, 1910) (from Tanzania)
Parotis impia (Meyrick, 1934) (from Congo & Zimbabwe)
Parotis incurvata Warren, 1896
Parotis invernalis (de Joannis, 1927) (from Mozambique)
Parotis laceritalis (Kenrick, 1907)
Parotis marginata (Hampson, 1893)
Parotis marinata (Fabricius, 1784)
Parotis minor (Pagenstecher, 1884)
Parotis nigroviridalis (Pagenstecher, 1888)
Parotis ogasawarensis (Shibuya, 1929)
Parotis pomonalis (Guenée, 1854)
Parotis prasinalis (Saalmüller, 1880)
Parotis prasinophila (Hampson, 1912)
Parotis punctiferalis (Walker, 1866)
Parotis pusillalis (Strand, 1912)
Parotis pyritalis (Hampson, 1912)
Parotis squamitibialis (Strand, 1912)
Parotis squamopedalis (Guenée, 1854)
Parotis suralis (Lederer, 1863)
Parotis triangulalis (Strand, 1912)
Parotis vernalis (Hampson, 1912)
Parotis zambesalis (Walker, 1866)

Former species
Parotis tricoloralis (Pagenstecher, 1888)
Parotis tritonalis (Snellen, 1895)

References

 

Spilomelinae
Crambidae genera
Taxa named by Jacob Hübner